The Liverpool Player of the Season Award, is one of a set of official end of season awards given to the best performing player over the course of the Premier League Season as voted for by the fans. The inaugural award was handed out in 2001, with just the 'Player of the Season' Award. This title was initially awarded by fans voting on Liverpool's official club website, however the number of awards expanded following the introduction of an awards dinner, the inaugural event held in 2014, and has been held every season since. The number of awards expanded to include 'Players' Player of the Season' (as well as Fans' Player), Goal of the season and Women's Player of the season, as well as a number of other awards for academy players, technical staff and fans other outstanding services to the club.

Awards ceremony

Awards dinner 
Since the introduction of the awards dinner, the awards have been presented after the end of the Premier League season, usually at the start of May but held at any point during the month. The event is open to staff and fans, who may buy tickets on the club website, and has been held at a number of prominent venues, a list of which is provided below:

Trophy 
The trophies have had a number of designs – the 2012–13 award was named 'Standard Chartered Player of the Season' for sponsorship reasons and was in the design of the Standard Chartered logo accordingly. Since this, the trophies have taken the form of an opaque circle within a hollow circle emblazoned with the Liverpool logo.

Winners

Men's Player of the Season Award 
The Fans' Player of the season is determined through a vote on the LFC website in which 5 candidates are nominated by the club. Fans are then free to vote for their player of choice. The player with the greatest number of votes wins the award. This award has been presented from 2001 onward.

The Players' player of the year award is given to the player at the club with the greatest number of votes from teammates. This award has been presented from the 2013–14 season onwards. However, in every year both awards have been presented, they have both gone to the same player.

Women's Player of the Season Award 
Similarly to the men's award, a player of the season is chosen by both the fans and the players and separate awards are granted depending on the result of each vote. This award has been part of the awards night from the end of the 2013–14 season, although the players' player award has only been presented from the end of the 2017–18 season. A Young Player of the year also is granted to the best 'young' player on the team.

Young Player of the Season/Academy Player of the Season 
The Young Player of the Season was awarded alongside the player of the year award in 2010 and is awarded to the young player who has performed the best for Liverpool's first team that season, with the Academy's player of the year award being officially added with the introduction of the awards dinner in 2014, and being granted to the best performing player in the academy squad.

Goal of the Season/Performance of the Season 
The Goal of the Season is decided by a vote from the fans on the 'best goal' scored that season, whereas performance of the season refers to a specific performance by a player which is deemed to be the best of the season. The former has been awarded since 2014, with the latter being added to the roster of awards in 2015. The performance of the season award appears to have been discontinued following the second issue of the award in 2016.

Club awards 
Since the inception of the awards dinner, a number of awards celebrating non-players have been introduced. Some of these awards have been presented in every awards dinner since 2014, whereas others have been one-off recognition, or been discontinued in place of other awards. A total of 8 different awards have been issued and presented so far, the criteria for winning each award explained the list of winners below:

Winners

Award Criteria 
Outstanding Achievement Award – Awarded for exceptional achievement at the club. Given to Brendan Rodgers in 2014 for leading Liverpool back into the Champions League, and to Gerrard following his announcement of retirement in 2015 for exceptional commitment to the club. Discontinued after 2015.

Bill Shankly Community Award – Named for Bill Shankly, manager from 1959–1974 and "awarded to the person who has shown commitment to their community through supporting local projects and activities or by selflessly giving their time to help others" Can be granted to players, non-players, or organisations such as Fans Supporting Foodbanks in 2018.

Lifetime Achievement – Awarded for stellar commitment to the club over an exceptional period of time.

Staff Recognition – "for a member of club staff who is dedicated to Liverpool FC and upholds the Liverpool way" Was not awarded in 2018 and as such may have been discontinued.

Supporter's Club – Supporter's Club of the Year

Fan of the Year – A currently one-off award granted to the nominated fan of the year. Polish fan Rado Chmiel is the current only holder of this award after being discontinued in 2014

Special Recognition Award – A currently one-off award granted to award special recognition to an individual

Outstanding Team Achievement Award  – Awarded to recognise historical team achievements (such as prior European Cup Winning Squads)

References 

Liverpool F.C.